David James (born 1967) is an Australian television and film actor based in Melbourne.

Career
James is best known for his long-running role as a presenter on ABC TV's children's program Play School, a role he started in 1993 and worked in until 2000. James also had minor roles in such Australian TV series as City Homicide, Very Small Business, All Saints, Water Rats, G.P., and Police Rescue over an extended period. In 2008 James gained a leading support role in Working Dog Productions satirical political television series The Hollowmen, where he played the part of Phillip, Secretary of the Department of the Prime Minister and Cabinet.

James has appeared on television commercials, worked with Play School co-presenter Benita Collings on live Play School Concerts, and performed in live theatre. In 2009 he took a starring role in the Australian production of Avenue Q, a stage musical he described as "Sesame Street meets South Park on acid".

James had a significant supporting role in the 2012 Australian comedy film Any Questions for Ben?, created by Working Dog Productions, where he played Malcolm, the lead character's boss.

James won a Logie at the 2009 Logie Awards for "Most Outstanding Comedy Program" as part of the cast of The Hollowmen.

References

External links

Living people
Australian male television actors
Australian male film actors
Place of birth missing (living people)
1967 births
Australian children's television presenters